Alfred Kaminski (born 26 February 1964) is a German football manager.

References

1964 births
Living people
German football managers
1. FC Saarbrücken managers
FC 08 Homburg managers
3. Liga managers